This is a list of episodes for the anime Wolf's Rain. The series was created by Keiko Nobumoto and Bones and directed by Tensai Okamura. Originally broadcast across Japan on Fuji TV and the anime CS television network, Animax, between January 6, 2003 and July 29, 2003, it ran for a full season of 26 episodes, with four more OVA episodes being released on DVD in Japan, in January and February 2004, completing the story. Wolf’s Rain was also seen in American TV broadcast on Cartoon Network’s Adult Swim late-night programming block in 2004.

All of the music used in Wolf's Rain soundtrack was composed and arranged by Yoko Kanno, with vocals provided by various artists, including Maaya Sakamoto, Ilaria Graziano, Steve Conte, and Joyce. While most anime series use primarily Japanese language themes, both the opening and ending themes for this series are performed in English. Written by Tim Jensen and performed by Steve Conte, the song "Stray" is used as the opening theme for the first 25 episodes and the second OVA episode. The other three OVA episodes do not have any opening sequences at all. "Gravity", written by Troy and performed by Maaya Sakamoto, is used as the closing theme for the first 25 episodes and the first three OVA episodes.  The 26th episode uses a different ending theme, the song "Tell Me What the Rain Knows", written by Chris Mosdell and performed by Sakamoto. For the final OVA episode, the original opening, "Stray" is used to close the series.

In another variation from most anime series, the title screens for each episode appear at the end of the episode rather than near the beginning.  As the episode ends, but before the ending theme is played, the title is displayed in white kanji on a black screen.  In the Bandai Region 1 release, the English title is added to the top center of the screen, also in white.

Episodes

DVD releases

Region 1
In Region 1, the series was released to DVD by Bandai Entertainment. The series was originally released as seven individual volumes, with the first volume having a regular and a limited edition option.  The limited edition came with the Wolf's Rain Original Soundtrack CD, a Kiba wolf plushie, and an art box. A few months after the final volume was released, Bandai released a seven disk limited edition box set that contained the entire series. In 2006, the series as re-releases as a two volume collection under as part of Bandai's economy Anime Legends label.

Each volume included Japanese and English language audio tracks and English subtitles. The volume covers use the original artwork from the Japanese DVD releases. For the first five volumes, the artwork from the corresponding original release was used, resulting in the art work relating more to episodes from the previous volume than the ones for the previous one.  The 6th volume uses the cover from the 7th volume of the Japanese release, while the 7th volume uses the cover from the 10th volume of the Japanese releases.

After Bandai Entertainment went out of business, Funimation secured the rights to Wolf's Rain, and released the anime under their rights on February 7, 2017 on DVD and for the first time on Blu-ray. The anime has yet to see a release in the latter format in Japan.

Region 2 (Japan)
Wolf's Rain was released in Japan by Bandai Visual across 8 volumes, with each volume having 3-4 episodes on a single disc with a Japanese language track and no subtitles.  The first volume was released on June 23, 2003. The first pressing of the first volume included an A-2 sized cloth poster. The final four OVA episodes of the series were released in two additional volumes, each containing two episodes.

Region 2 (Europe)
In Europe (Region 2), the series was released as in seven volumes by Beez Entertainment.  Each volume included Japanese, English, and French language audio tracks and English, French, Dutch, and Polish subtitle options.  While the volume DVD covers have the same art work as their Region 1 equivalents, the Region 2 volumes have different volume names, different episode counts, and different extras.  Most of the volumes include character bios and textless opening and ending sequences.

Region 4
In Region 4, Madman Entertainment released Wolf's Rain in six individual volumes, followed by a single complete collection containing the entire series.  Each volume included Japanese and English language audio tracks and English subtitles.

See also

 List of Wolf's Rain characters

References
General episode information

Updated List of Wolf's Rain episodes on DoramasMp4
English episode titles

Specific

Lists of anime episodes